COPA De Bangkok is a Brazilian jiu-jitsu competition that developed from "BJJ Thailand open" in 2008 which are created by a group of "BJJ gyms" in Bangkok.

History 
Since 2016, Bangkok Fight Lab, under the management of Morgan Perkins, has been responsible for holding the event. This caused the technical level of the competition to be regulated by IBJJF and ADCC standards. Every year, more than 400 participants from more than 50 countries compete in this event. But in 2020, the tournament was canceled due to restrictions imposed by the Thai government due to the COVID-19 pandemic.

Divisions 
The following is a sample of the divisions used by Copa de Bangkok divided into their respective weight brackets.

Youth

Women

Men

Rules

No-Gi

Gi

COPA De Bangkok 2019 
COPA de Bangkok Brazilian Jiu-Jitsu competition was held on November 23–24, 2019 at National Stadium in Bangkok. The presence of 477 Fighters from all over the world has increased the importance of the championships.

List of men champions

Male Gi / White / Adult

Male Gi / White / Master 1 (30+)

Male Gi / White / Master 2 (36+)

Male Gi / Blue / Adult

Male Gi / Blue / Master 1 (30+)

Male Gi / Blue / Master 2 (36+)

Male Gi / Purple / Adult

Male Gi / Purple / Master 1 (30+)

Male Gi / Purple / Master 2 (36+)

Male Gi / Brown / Adult

Male Gi / Brown / Master 1 (30+)

Male Gi / Brown / Master 2 (36+)

Male Gi / Black / Adult

Male No-Gi / Beginner / Adult

Male No-Gi / Beginner / Master 1 (30+)

Male No-Gi / Beginner / Master 2 (36+)

Male No-Gi / Intermediate / Adult

Male No-Gi / Intermediate / Master 1 (30+)

Male No-Gi / Intermediate / Master 2 (36+)

Male No-Gi / Advanced / Adult

Male Absolute Gi / White / Adult

Male Absolute Gi / White / Master 1 (30+)

Male Absolute Gi / White / Master 2 (36+)

Male Absolute Gi / Blue / Adult

Male Absolute Gi / Blue / Master 1 (30+)

Male Absolute Gi / Blue / Master 2 (36+)

Male Absolute Gi / Purple / Adult

Male Absolute Gi / Purple / Master 2 (36+)

Male Absolute Gi / Brown / Adult

Male Absolute Gi / Brown / Master 1 (30+)

Male Absolute Gi / Black / Adult

Male Absolute No-Gi / Beginner / Adult

Male Absolute No-Gi / Beginner / Master 1 (30+)

Male Absolute No-Gi / Beginner / Master 2 (36+)

Male Absolute No-Gi / Intermediate / Adult

Male Absolute No-Gi / Intermediate / Master 1 (30+)

Male Absolute No-Gi / Intermediate / Master 2 (36+)

Male Absolute No-Gi / Advanced / Adult

List of women champions

Female Gi / White / Adult

Female Gi / White / Master 1 (30+)

Female Gi / Blue / Adult

Female No-Gi / Beginner / Adult

Female No-Gi / Intermediate / Adult

Female Absolute Gi / White / Adult

Female Absolute Gi / Blue / Adult

Female Absolute No-Gi / Beginner / Adult

Female Absolute No-Gi / Intermediate / Adult

References

External links 
 
 
 2019 COPA de Bangkok results in Smoothcomp
 2019 COPA de Bangkok in Smoothcomp

Brazilian jiu-jitsu competitions
Martial arts in Thailand